Agnes Robertson Moorehead (December 6, 1900April 30, 1974) was an American actress. In a career spanning five decades, her credits included work in radio, stage, film, and television. Moorehead was the recipient of such accolades as a Primetime Emmy Award and two Golden Globe Awards, in addition to nominations for four Academy Awards. 

Moorehead had joined Orson Welles' Mercury Players, as one of his principal performers in 1937. She also had notable roles in films such as Citizen Kane (1941), Dark Passage (1947), Show Boat (1951), and All That Heaven Allows (1955). Moorehead garnered four nominations for the Academy Award for Best Supporting Actress, for her performances in: The Magnificent Ambersons (1942), Mrs. Parkington (1944), Johnny Belinda (1948), and Hush...Hush, Sweet Charlotte (1964). She is also known for the radioplay Sorry, Wrong Number (1943).

She gained acclaim for her role as Endora on the ABC sitcom Bewitched which she played from 1964 to 1972. Her performance earned her six Primetime Emmy Award for Outstanding Supporting Actress in a Comedy Series nominations. For her role on the western series The Wild Wild West she won the Primetime Emmy Award for Outstanding Supporting Actress in a Drama Series.

Early life
Agnes Robertson Moorehead was born on December 6, 1900, in Clinton, Massachusetts, the daughter of former singer Mary (née McCauley), who was 17 when she was born, and Presbyterian clergyman John Henderson Moorehead. She was of English, Irish, Scottish, and Welsh ancestry. Moorehead later claimed that she was born in 1906 to appear younger for acting parts. She recalled that she made her first public performance at the age of three, when she recited the Lord's Prayer in her father's church. The family moved to St. Louis, Missouri, and her ambition to become an actress grew "very strong". Her mother indulged her active imagination, often asking, "Who are you today, Agnes?" while Moorehead and her younger sister Peggy (born Margaret Ann) engaged in mimicry. This involved coming to the dinner table and imitating their father's parishioners; they were further encouraged by his amused reactions.

As a young woman, Moorehead joined the chorus of the St. Louis Municipal Opera Company, known as "The Muny". In addition to her interest in acting, she developed a lifelong interest in religion; in later years, actors such as Dick Sargent recalled Moorehead's arriving on the set with "the Bible in one hand and the script in the other".

Moorehead earned a bachelor's degree in 1923, majoring in biology at Muskingum College in New Concord, Ohio. While there, she also appeared in college stage plays. She received an honorary doctorate in literature from Muskingum in 1947, and served for a year on its board of trustees. When her family moved to Reedsburg, Wisconsin, she taught public school for five years in Soldiers Grove, Wisconsin, while she also earned a master's degree in English and public speaking at the University of Wisconsin (now the University of Wisconsin–Madison). She then pursued postgraduate studies at the American Academy of Dramatic Arts, from which she graduated with honors in 1929. Moorehead also received an honorary doctoral degree from Bradley University in Peoria, Illinois.

Career

Moorehead's early acting career was unsteady, and although she was able to find stage work, she was often unemployed. She later recalled going four days without food, and said that it had taught her "the value of a dollar". She found work in radio and was soon in demand, often working on several programs in a single day. She believed that it offered her excellent training and allowed her to develop her voice to create a variety of characterizations. Moorehead met actress Helen Hayes, who encouraged her to enter films, but her first attempts were met with failure. When she was rejected as not being "the right type", Moorehead returned to radio.

Mercury Theatre

By 1937, Moorehead had joined Orson Welles' Mercury Players, as one of his principal performers along with Joseph Cotten. (In an appearance on The Dick Cavett Show on February 19, 1973, she revealed that, in 1922, she had by chance met Welles (15 years her junior) when he was a mere seven years old at the Waldorf-Astoria Hotel in New York City.) She performed in his The Mercury Theatre on the Air radio adaptations, and had a regular role opposite Welles in the serial The Shadow as Margo Lane. In 1939, Welles moved the Mercury Theatre to Hollywood, where he started working for RKO Pictures. Several of his radio performers joined him, and Moorehead made her film debut as the mother of his own character, Charles Foster Kane, in Citizen Kane (1941), considered by most film critics as one of the best films ever made. Moorehead was featured in Welles' second film, The Magnificent Ambersons (1942), and received the New York Film Critics Award and an Academy Award nomination for her performance. She also appeared in Journey Into Fear (1943), a Mercury film production.

Moorehead received positive reviews for her performance in Mrs. Parkington (1944), and the Golden Globe Award for Best Supporting Actress and an Academy Award nomination. Moorehead played another strong role in The Big Street (1942) with Henry Fonda and Lucille Ball, and then appeared in two films that failed to find an audience, Government Girl (1943) with Olivia de Havilland and The Youngest Profession (1944) with adolescent Virginia Weidler.

Metro-Goldwyn-Mayer
By the mid-1940s, Moorehead became a Metro-Goldwyn-Mayer contract player, negotiating a $6,000-a-week contract, which also allowed her to perform on radio, an unusual clause at the time. Moorehead explained that MGM usually refused to allow their actors to appear on radio, as "the actors didn't have the knowledge or the taste or the judgment to appear on the right sort of show." In 1943–1944, Moorehead portrayed "matronly housekeeper Mrs. Mullet", who was constantly offering her "candied opinion", in the Mutual Broadcasting System's The Adventures of Leonidas Witherall; she inaugurated the role on CBS Radio.

Throughout her career, Moorehead skillfully portrayed puritanical matrons, neurotic spinsters, possessive mothers, and comical secretaries. She had supporting roles in The Youngest Profession (1943),  Since You Went Away (1944), and the crime drama Dark Passage (1947), starring Humphrey Bogart and Lauren Bacall. She then played Aggie McDonald in the 1948 film, Johnny Belinda. She played Parthy Hawks, wife of Cap'n Andy and mother of Magnolia, in MGM's hit 1951 remake of Show Boat. Moorehead was in Broadway productions of Don Juan in Hell in 1951–1952, and Lord Pengo in 1962–1963.

Radio
In her first radio role, Moorehead appeared as a replacement for Dorothy Denvir's role as Min Gump in The Gumps. During the 1940s and 1950s, Moorehead was one of the most in-demand actresses for radio dramas, especially on the CBS show Suspense. During the 946-episode run of Suspense, Moorehead was cast in more episodes than any other actor or actress. She was often introduced on the show as the "first lady of Suspense". Moorehead's most successful appearance on Suspense was in the play Sorry, Wrong Number, written by Lucille Fletcher, broadcast on May 18, 1943. Moorehead played a selfish, neurotic woman who overhears a murder being plotted via crossed phone wires and eventually realizes she is the intended victim. She recreated the performance six times for Suspense and several times on other radio shows, always using her original, dog-eared script. The May 25, 1943 airing was made part of the National Sound Registry by the Library of Congress in 2014. In 1952, she recorded an album of the drama, and performed scenes from the story in her one-woman show in the 1950s. Barbara Stanwyck played the role in the 1948 film version.

In 1941, Moorehead played Maggie in the short-lived Bringing Up Father program on the Blue Network. From 1942 to 1949, Moorehead played the role of the mayor's housekeeper in the radio version of Mayor of the Town. She also starred in The Amazing Mrs. Danberry, a situation comedy on CBS in 1946. Moorehead's title character was described as "the lively widow of a department store owner who has a tongue as sharp as a hatpin and a heart as warm as summer." Moorehead played one of her last roles on January 6, 1974, as Mrs. Ada Canby in the ironically titled "The Old Ones Are Hard to Kill", the inaugural episode of CBS Radio Mystery Theater.

Films of the 1950s–1960s
In the 1950s, Moorehead continued to work in films and appeared on stage across the country. Her stage roles included a national tour of Shaw's Don Juan in Hell, co-starring Charles Boyer, Charles Laughton, and Cedric Hardwicke, and the pre-Broadway engagements of the new musical The Pink Jungle. She had a supporting role in the big-budget Howard Hughes film The Conqueror (1956), starring John Wayne and Susan Hayward, a film she later regretted appearing in. She starred in The Bat (1959) with Vincent Price. She appeared as the hypochondriac Mrs. Snow in Disney's hit film Pollyanna (1960). She starred with Bette Davis, Olivia de Havilland, Mary Astor, and Joseph Cotten in Hush...Hush, Sweet Charlotte (1964) as the maid Velma, a role for which she was nominated for a Best Supporting Actress Academy Award.

Television
In 1959, Moorehead guest-starred on many series, including The Rebel and Alcoa Theatre. Her role in the radio play Sorry, Wrong Number inspired writers of the CBS television series The Twilight Zone to script an episode with Moorehead in mind. In "The Invaders" (broadcast January 27, 1961), Moorehead played a woman whose isolated farm is plagued by mysterious intruders. Moorehead found the script odd, because it had only one line of dialogue, at the very end. Her character gasped in terror once or twice, but never spoke. In Sorry, Wrong Number, Moorehead offered a famed, bravura performance using only her voice.

Moorehead also had guest roles on Channing, Custer, Rawhide in "Incident at Poco Tiempo" as Sister Frances, and The Rifleman. On February 10, 1967, she portrayed Miss Emma Valentine in "The Night of the Vicious Valentine" on The Wild Wild West, a performance for which she won a Primetime Emmy Award for Outstanding Supporting Actress in a Drama Series.

Bewitched

In 1964, Moorehead accepted the role of Endora, Samantha's (Elizabeth Montgomery) mortal-loathing, quick-witted witch mother in the situation comedy Bewitched. She later commented that she had not expected it to succeed and that she ultimately felt trapped by its success, but she had negotiated to appear in only eight of every 12 episodes made, thus allowing her sufficient time to pursue other projects. She also felt that the television writing was often below standard and dismissed many of the Bewitched scripts as "hack" in a 1965 interview for TV Guide. The role brought her a level of recognition that she had not received before as Bewitched was in the top-10 programs for the first few years it aired.

Moorehead received six Emmy Award nominations, but was quick to remind interviewers that she had enjoyed a long and distinguished career. Despite her ambivalence, she remained with Bewitched until its run ended in 1972. She commented to the New York Times in 1974, "I've been in movies and played theater from coast to coast, so I was quite well known before Bewitched, and I don't particularly want to be identified as a witch." Later that year, she said she had enjoyed playing the role enough, but it was not challenging and the show itself was "not breathtaking", although her flamboyant and colorful character appealed to children. She expressed a fondness for the show's star, Elizabeth Montgomery, and said she had enjoyed working with her. Co-star Dick Sargent, who in 1969 replaced the ill Dick York as Samantha's husband Darrin Stephens, had a more difficult relationship with Moorehead, describing her as "a tough old bird."

In fall 1964, Moorehead participated in a 5-minute commercial spot featuring casts of both Bonanza and Bewitched, announcing the new 1965 Chevrolet line. Moorehead was featured with Dan Blocker extolling the virtues of the new '65 Chevy II.

Later years
In the 1970s, Moorehead's life was increasingly affected by declining health. In 1970, Moorehead appeared as a dying woman who haunts her own house in the early Night Gallery episode "Certain Shadows on the Wall". She co-starred with Shelley Winters and Debbie Reynolds in the horror film What's the Matter with Helen? (1971) and had the lead role in the low-budget ax murderer film Dear Dead Delilah (1972) with Will Geer, her last starring role. She also reprised her role in Don Juan in Hell on Broadway and on tour, with an all-star cast that featured Edward Mulhare, Ricardo Montalbán, and Paul Henreid.

Moorehead supplied the voice of the friendly "Goose" in Hanna-Barbera's 1973 adaptation of E. B. White's children's book Charlotte's Web.

For the 1973 Broadway adaptation of Gigi, Moorehead portrayed Aunt Alicia and performed various songs, including "The Contract" for the original cast recording. She fell ill during the production, resulting in Arlene Francis having to replace her. Moorehead died shortly afterward.

In January 1974, three months before her death, two episodes featuring Moorehead (including the series' premiere episode) aired on the CBS Radio Mystery Theater, the popular radio show produced and directed by Himan Brown.

Personal life

Marriages

In 1930, Moorehead married actor John Griffith Lee; they divorced a year after fostering a boy named Sean in 1952. She married actor Robert Gist in 1954, and they divorced in 1958.

Sexuality
Moorehead's sexuality has been the subject of much speculation and dispute. A number of articles that appeared in periodicals in the alternative press have identified her as a lesbian. Paul Lynde, Moorehead's co-star on Bewitched, stated: "Well, the whole world knows Agnes was a lesbian – I mean classy as hell, but one of the all-time Hollywood dykes". Journalist Boze Hadleigh reported an incident, also sourced to Lynde, in which, when she caught one of her husbands cheating on her, "Agnes screamed at him that if he could have a mistress, so could she." In an interview, Moorehead acknowledged her same-sex orientation while she identified a number of other Hollywood actresses who "enjoyed lesbian or bi relationships."

Moorehead's close friend Debbie Reynolds stated categorically that Moorehead was not a lesbian. Reynolds's autobiography mentions the rumor and states it was started "maliciously" by one of Moorehead's husbands during their divorce. Moorehead's longtime friend and producer Paul Gregory concurs in the assessment. Quint Benedetti, Moorehead's longtime employee who was homosexual, also stated that Moorehead was not a lesbian and attributed the story to Paul Lynde's frequent gossiping and rumor-mongering.

Politics
Moorehead rarely spoke publicly about her political beliefs, but she supported both Franklin Delano Roosevelt (she portrayed Eleanor Roosevelt multiple times over the course of her career), and close friend Ronald Reagan for his 1966 run for governor of California.

Death
Moorehead died of uterine cancer on April 30, 1974, in Rochester, Minnesota, aged 73. Her sole immediate survivor was her mother, Mary, who died in 1990 at the age of 106. It is speculated that Moorehead may have developed cancer from radioactive fallout from atmospheric atomic bomb tests while making The Conqueror with John Wayne in St. George, Utah. Several production members, as well as Wayne himself, Susan Hayward, Pedro Armendáriz (who died by suicide), and the film's director Dick Powell, later died from cancer and cancer-related illnesses. The cast and crew totaled 220 people. By the end of 1980, as ascertained by People, 91 of them had developed some form of cancer, and 46 had died of the disease. Sandra Gould said Moorehead was specifically concerned about being harmed by radiation from The Conqueror shoot.

Moorehead is entombed in a crypt at Dayton Memorial Park in Dayton, Ohio. In 1994, she was posthumously inducted into the St. Louis Walk of Fame.

Moorehead bequeathed $25,000 to Muskingum College, with instructions to fund one or more "Agnes Moorehead Scholarships". She also left half of her manuscripts to Muskingum with the other half going to the University of Wisconsin. Her family's Ohio farm went to John Brown University in Siloam Springs, Arkansas, along with her collection of Bibles and biblical scholarship materials.

Her mother Mary received all of Moorehead's clothing and jewelry, and Moorehead made provisions to support Mary for the rest of her life. The Beverly Hills home was left to her attorney Franklin Rohner, along with the furnishings and personal property within. Small bequests were made for friends and domestic staff along with some charitable contributions. In her will, she made no provision for Sean (né John Griffith Lee), whom it was alleged she had adopted. In fact, she had fostered Sean only until his 18th birthday, and her will stated that she had "no children, natural or adopted, living or deceased".

Acting credits

Filmography

Television

Theater 
Moorehead began appearing on stage during her training at the American Academy of Dramatic Arts. She appeared in seven productions as a student. She continued acting in the theater throughout her career until just a few months before her death.

Radio 
Moorehead appeared on hundreds of individual broadcasts across a radio career that spanned from 1926 to her final two appearances, on CBS Radio Mystery Theater in 1974.

Awards and nominations

Notes

References

Sources 
 Lynn Kear, Agnes Moorehead: a Bio-Bibliography. (Westport, Connecticut: Greenwood Press, 1992). 
 Charles Tranberg, I Love the Illusion: The Life And Career of Agnes Moorehead (Albany, Georgia: BearManor Media, 2005)

Further reading

External links 

 
 
 
 Guide to over 100,000 Moorehead documents spanning 1923–1974 at the Wisconsin Historical Society
 Georgia Johnstone papers regarding Agnes Moorehead, 1930–1974, held by the Billy Rose Theatre Division, New York Public Library for the Performing Arts
 Interview with biographer Charles Tranberg from Harpies Bizarre
 Listen to – Suspense 1951-02-15 Agnes Moorehead – The Death Parade with new introduction.
 Listen to – The CBS Radio Mystery Theater 1974-01-06 The Old Ones Are Hard To Kill starring Agnes Moorehead.
 Agnes Moorehead as a child circa 1904(Wisconsin Historical Society)
 Agnes Moorehead as a child wearing white dress 1903(Wisconsin Historical Society)

1900 births
1974 deaths
20th-century American actresses
Actresses from Massachusetts
Actresses from St. Louis
American Academy of Dramatic Arts alumni
American Presbyterians
American film actresses
American people of English descent
American people of Irish descent
American people of Scottish descent
American people of Welsh descent
American radio actresses
American stage actresses
American television actresses
Best Supporting Actress Golden Globe (film) winners
Bewitched
Burials in Ohio
California Republicans
Deaths from cancer in Minnesota
Deaths from uterine cancer
Metro-Goldwyn-Mayer contract players
Muskingum University alumni
Outstanding Performance by a Supporting Actress in a Drama Series Primetime Emmy Award winners
People from Clinton, Massachusetts
People from Greater Los Angeles
People from Reedsburg, Wisconsin
People from Zanesville, Ohio
Western (genre) television actors